The 2006 Orlando Predators season was the 16th season for the franchise. They lost the Arenabowl against the Chicago Rush

Coaching
Jay Gruden started his third season as head coach of the Predators. He'd also coached for four years from 1998–2001.

Personnel moves

Acquired

Departures

2006 roster

Stats

Offense

Quarterback

External links

Orlando Predators
Orlando Predators seasons
Orlando Predators
2000s in Orlando, Florida